Velia caprai, known as the water cricket, is a species of aquatic bug found in Europe. It is distasteful to predatory fish, engages in kleptoparasitism, and can travel at twice its normal speed by spitting on the water surface.

Description
Members of the family Veliidae resemble the pond skaters of the family Gerridae, but with stouter middle and hind legs, and a generally stouter appearance.

Ecology
Velia caprai has a chemical defence mechanism which is often able to prevent predation. It is so distasteful to brown trout (Salmo trutta) that the fish will spit out any Velia caprai it takes without causing them any damage.

Behaviour
Velia caprai is subject to kleptoparasitism.

Velia caprai aligns itself to the plane of polarised light, although the reasons for this behaviour are not clear.

Taxonomic history
Velia caprai was first described as a separate species by Livio Tamanini in 1947, in a monographic revision of the genus Velia. Formerly, V. caprai and other species, such as V. saulii, were included in Velia currens (Fabricius, 1794).

References

Veliidae
Hemiptera of Europe
Insects described in 1947